Guy IV of Châtillon, Count of Saint Pol ( – 6 April 1317) was a French nobleman. He was the son of Guy III, Count of Saint-Pol and Matilda of Brabant.

In 1292, he married Marie of Brittany, daughter of John II, Duke of Brittany and Beatrice of England. They had eight children:
 John, Count of Saint-Pol (d. 1344), married Joanna, daughter of John I of Fiennes
 Jacques of Châtillon (d.s.p. 1365), Lord of Ancre
 Mahaut of Châtillon (1293–1358), married in 1308 Charles of Valois
 Beatrix of Châtillon, married in 1315 John of Dampierre, Lord of Crèvecœur
 Isabeau of Châtillon (d. 19 May 1360), married in May 1311 William I de Coucy, Lord of Coucy
 Marie of Châtillon, married Aymer de Valence, 2nd Earl of Pembroke
 Eleanor of Châtillon, married John III Malet, Lord of Graville
 Jeanne of Châtillon, married Miles de Noyers, Lord of Maisy

He held the office of Grand Butler of France.

He was placed in joint command (with Robert VI of Auvergne) of one of the two reserve "battles" of the French troops at the Battle of the Golden Spurs, where the French army was led by his elder half-brother Robert II, Count of Artois. He was able to escape when the French were routed by the Flemings, but his brother Jacques, elder half-brother Robert, and many of his relatives were killed.

References

Sources

External links
 genealogie-mittelalter.de
 De Liebaart

1250s births
Year of birth uncertain
1317 deaths
Guy 04
Guy 04